Charles John MacDonal Fox (5 December 1858 – 1 April 1901) was an English cricketer. He played 80 first-class matches for Kent and Surrey between 1876 and 1893.

References

External links

 

1858 births
1901 deaths
English cricketers
Kent cricketers
Surrey cricketers
Gentlemen of England cricketers
North v South cricketers
C. I. Thornton's XI cricketers
Hurst Park Club cricketers